The Apache Chief is a 1920 German silent comedy film directed by Fred Sauer and starring Friedrich Zelnik, Wilhelm Diegelmann and Lya Mara.

Cast
In alphabetical order
 Harry Berber
 Wilhelm Diegelmann
 Lya Mara
 Kurt Mikulski
 Poldi Müller
 Fritz Schulz
 Frederic Zelnik

References

Bibliography

External links

1920 films
Films of the Weimar Republic
Films directed by Fred Sauer
German silent feature films
German black-and-white films
1920 comedy films
German comedy films
Silent comedy films
1920s German films
1920s German-language films